The Wuhan Open (currently sponsored by Dongfeng Motor) is a tennis tournament held in Wuhan, Hubei Province, China and organized for female professional tennis players. It is one of the WTA 1000 tournaments on the WTA Tour and made its debut in the 2014 season.

The Wuhan Open is one of three Women's Tennis Association events in China that were new to the calendar in 2014, bringing the total number of women's professional tournaments in the country to six. It is also one of two Premier-level stops in China. The tournament was scheduled in 2014 to run during the week of 22 September, and took over from the Pan Pacific Open held in Tokyo, Japan as a Premier 5-level event, thereby making it the second largest women's tennis tournament in East Asia, after the China Open in Beijing. It is on the calendar between the aforementioned Premier events in Tokyo (the Pan Pacific Open) and Beijing (the China Open), during the WTA's Asian swing.

Wuhan, the capital of Hubei province and the most populous city in Central China, is the hometown of two-time Grand Slam champion Li Na.

Results

Singles

Doubles

See also
 Women's Tennis Association
 List of tennis tournaments
 Optics Valley International Tennis Center

References

External links
 Official website
 Wuhan Open on Women's Tennis Association
 

 
Tennis tournaments in China
Hard court tennis tournaments
WTA Tour
Recurring sporting events established in 2014
2014 establishments in China